Alberto Ughi (born 16 April 1951) is an Italian sprint canoer who competed in the early 1970s. At the 1972 Summer Olympics in Munich, he finished fourth in the K-4 1000 m event.

References
Sports-reference.com profile

External links

1951 births
Canoeists at the 1972 Summer Olympics
Italian male canoeists
Living people
Olympic canoeists of Italy
Place of birth missing (living people)
20th-century Italian people